Badlands is the debut studio album by the band of the same name. This album features Ray Gillen and Eric Singer, who previously played together in Black Sabbath. This album also features guitarist Jake E. Lee and bassist Greg Chaisson. Singer later played on Chaisson's solo album It's About Time. The album had sold 400,000 copies by 1990, according to Chaisson, in a Hit Parader interview from that year. It was also ranked No. 35 in Rolling Stones list of 50 Greatest Hair Metal Albums of All Time.

Critical reception
Kirk Blows, reviewer of British music newspaper Music Week, named LP as "accomplished and worthy debut" and praised its diversity. Billboard called this record "a collection of well-crafted tunes that should jump out of the radio and sound great live."

Track listing

Personnel
Badlands
Ray Gillen – lead vocals, harmonica
Jake E. Lee – guitars, mandolin, sitar, keyboards
Greg Chaisson – bass
Eric Singer – drums

Additional musicians
Taso Karras – tambourine, maracas
Bob Kinkel – keyboards programming

Production
Paul O'Neill – producer
James A. Ball – engineer, mixing
Chuck Cavanaugh, Glen Marchese, Joe Henehan, John Mathias, Teddy Trewhella – additional engineering
Dave Parla, Deek Venarchick – assistant engineers
David Thoener – mixing
Jack Skinner – mastering at Europadisk, New York

Charts

Album

Singles

Accolades

References

External links
 Album information at Black Sabbath Online

Badlands (American band) albums
1989 debut albums
Atlantic Records albums
Albums produced by Paul O'Neill (rock producer)